Colors Cineplex Bollywood is a Hindi language movie channel in India, owned by Viacom 18. this movie channel primarily focuses only on Bollywood movies and it became the third movie channel after Colors Cineplex and Rishtey Cineplex from the same parent company.

List of movies

A 
 Aa Dekhen Zara (2009)
 Aan: Men at Work (2004)
 Aarakshan (2011)
 Abhimaan (1973)
 Adventures of Tarzan (1985)
 Ae Dil Hai Mushkil (2016)
 Agneepath (1990)
 Agneepath (2012)
 Ajab Prem Ki Ghazab Kahani (2009)
 Aladin (2009)
 Albela (2001)
 Amar Akbar Anthony (1977)
 Andaz Apna Apna (1994)
 Annarth (2002)
 Anth (1994)
 Apne (2007)
 Armaan (2003)
 Aśoka (2001)
 Awara Paagal Deewana (2002)
 Aur Pyaar Ho Gaya  (1997)

B 
 Bade Dilwala (1999)
 Bajirao Mastani (2015)
 Beiimaan Love (2016)
 Bhoot (2003)
 Blue (2009)
 Bol (2011)
 Boss (2013)
 Brothers (2015)

C 
 Chalte Chalte (2003)
 Champion (2000)
 Chhalaang (2020)
 Chennai Express (2013)
 Chori Chori (2003)

D 
 Dabangg (2010)
 Damini (1993)
 Dancer (1991)
 De Dana Dan (2009)
 Deedar (1992)
 Deewaar (2004)
 Deewane Huye Paagal (2005)
 Deewangee (2002)
 Devdas (2002)
 Dhanwan (1993)
 Dharam Sankat Mein (2015)
 Dil Hai Tumhaara (2002)
 Dil Ka Rishta (2003)
 Dil Ka Sauda (1999)
 Dil Se (1998)
 Dil Vil Pyar Vyar (2002)
 Dostana (1980)
 Dostana (2008)
 Dulhe Raja (1998)
 Dushmani: A Violent Love Story (1996)

E 
 Ek Din 24 Ghante (2003)
 English Babu Desi Mem (1996)

F 
 Force (2011)
 Force 2 (2016)
 Fraud Saiyaan (2019)

G 
 Gabbar Is Back (2015)
 Gangs of Wasseypur (2012)
 Gangs of Wasseypur II (2012)
 Garam Masala (2005)
 Goliyon Ki Raasleela Ram-Leela (2013)

H 
 Halla Bol (2008)
 Har Dil Jo Pyaar Karega (2000)
 Hera Pheri (2000)
 Hum Dil De Chuke Sanam (1999)
 Hum Tumhare Hain Sanam (2002)
 Humko Tumse Pyaar Hai (2006)

I 
 Ishqiya (2010)
 Ishq Vishk (2003)

J 
 Jaal (1986)
 Jaan-E-Mann: Let's Fall in Love... Again (2006)
 Jaani Dushman: Ek Anokhi Kahani (2002)
 Jab We Met (2007)
 Jallaad (1995)
 Jawani Zindabad (1990)
 Jeet (1996)
 Joru Ka Ghulam (2000)
 Judwaa (1997)
 Jugjugg Jeeyo (2022)

K 
 Kaagaz Ke Fools (2015)
 Kaal (2005)
 Kaalia (1981)
 Kaante (2002)
 Kabhi Alvida Naa Kehna (2006)
 Kabhi Khushi Kabhie Gham (2001)
 Kachche Dhaage (1999)
 Kal Ho Naa Ho (2003)
 Kambakkht Ishq (2009)
 Kapoor & Sons (2016)
 Kasam Vardi Ki (1989)
 Khoobsurat (1999)
 Kuch Kuch Hota Hai (1998)
 Kunwara (2000)
 Kya Kehna (2000)
 Kya Yehi Pyaar Hai (2002)

L 
 Lahu Ke Do Rang (1997)
 Laawaris (1999)
 Lekar Hum Deewana Dil (2014)
 Lucknow Central (2017)
 Love Aaj Kal (2009)

M 
 Maa Tujhhe Salaam (2002)
 Mai (2013)
 Main Hoon Na (2004)
 Maine Pyaar Kyun Kiya (2005)
 Majhdhaar (1996)
 Masti (2004)
 Mr Ya Miss (2005)
 Mudda - The Issue (2003)
 Mumbai 125 KM (2014)
 Mumbai Delhi Mumbai (2014)

N 
 Namak Halaal (1982)
 Namastey London (2007)

O 
 Om Shanti Om (2007)

P 
 Padmaavat (2018)
 Phir Bhi Dil Hai Hindustani (2000)
 Phir Hera Pheri (2006)
 Purani Jeans (2014)
 Pyaar Diwana Hota Hai (2002)
 Pyaar Ka Punchnama (2011)
 Pyaar Ka Punchnama 2 (2015)

R 
 R... Rajkumar (2013)
 Raghuveer (1995)
 Raja Hindustani (1996)
 Ram Aur Shyam (1967)
 Rangoon (2017)
 Red: The Dark Side (2007)

S 
 Saajan (1991)
 Saheb, Biwi Aur Gangster (2011)
 Saheb, Biwi Aur Gangster Returns (2013)
 Sangdil Sanam (1994)
 Sapne Saajan Ke (1992)
 Shapath (1997)
 Shreelancer (2017)
 Sohni Mahiwal (1984)
 Soldier (1998)
 Special 26 (2013)
 Student of the Year (2012)
 Student of the Year 2 (2019)
 Suhaag (1979)

T 
 Tanu Weds Manu (2011)
 Tees Maar Khan (2010)
 The Legend of Bhagat Singh (2002)

W 
 Welcome (2007)

Y 
 Yamla Pagla Deewana 2 (2013)
 Yeh Jawaani Hai Deewani (2013)
 Yodha (1991)

Z 
 Zor (1998)

References 

Television stations in Mumbai
Hindi-language television stations
Hindi-language television channels in India
Television channels and stations established in 2021
Viacom 18
Movie channels in India
2021 establishments in Maharashtra